Bacteridium vittatum is a species of sea snail, a marine gastropod mollusk in the family Pyramidellidae, the pyrams and their allies. The species belongs to the gastropod genus Bacteridium, along with Bacteridium bermudense, Bacteridium carinatum and Bacteridium resticulum.

References

External links
 

Pyramidellidae
Gastropods described in 1861